Ceryx hageni is a moth of the subfamily Arctiinae. It was described by Snellen in 1895. It is found on Sumatra.

References

Ceryx (moth)
Moths described in 1895